Shah Abd al-Wahhab (1894 – 2 June 1982) was a Bangladeshi Deobandi Islamic scholar, educator, jurist, and spiritual leader. He served as the second rector of Darul Uloom Hathazari, was a former vice-president of the Jamiat Ulema-e-Islam, and served on the jury of Chittagong Court for 23 years. He was an alumnus of Darul Uloom Deoband and Mazahir Uloom, and one of the important disciples of Ashraf Ali Thanwi. He is considered the second architect of the Darul Uloom Hathazari. He established several madrasas and mosques in Bangladesh and played various roles in the Bishwa Ijtema, the spread of Tablighi Jamaat across Bangladesh and Myanmar, Befaqul Madarisil Arabia Bangladesh, the Baitul Mukarram National Mosque, and the Islamic University, Bangladesh.

Early life and family 
Shah Abd al-Wahhab was born in 1894 into a Bengali Muslim zamindar family of Qadis in the village of Ruhullahpur in Hathazari, Chittagong District, Bengal Presidency. He was the only son of Qazi Abd al-Hakim and Begum Fazilatunnesa. His father was a sailor and a follower of Abdul Wahid Bengali. The family descended from Umar, the second Caliph of Islam, and served as judges under Islamic dynasties. Shah Abd al-Wahhab's ancestor, Shaykh Nasir ad-Din, migrated from Persia to the island of Sandwip on the Bay of Bengal. His great-grandfather, Shaykh Asʿad Ali, then moved from Sandwip to the village of Ruhullahpur in Hathazari, Chittagong District, where the family remained.

Education 
Shah Abd al-Wahhab began his education at the age of around four years old under the guidance of his paternal uncle, Qazi Abd al-Bari, who was a graduate of the first batch of students at Darul Uloom Hathazari. During his breaks, he also studied under his father, Qazi Abd al-Hakim. After completing his primary education in the Qur'an and Persian language, his parents enrolled him at Darul Uloom Hathazari in 1904 under the supervision of Habibullah Qurayshi. He graduated from the Dawra-e-Hadith (Masters) program in 1914.

After that, Shah Abd al-Wahhab went to the Mazahir Uloom and Darul Uloom Deoband seminaries in Saharanpur, India. His classmates included Muhammad Tayyib Qasmi and Shafi Usmani. He studied Sahih al-Bukhari under Anwar Shah Kashmiri, Sahih Muslim under Shabbir Ahmad Usmani, and Muwatta Imam Malik under Aziz-ul-Rahman Usmani. His other teachers were Izaz Ali Amrohi and Ibrahim Baliyavi. After completing his second Dawra-e-Hadith (Masters) from Deoband, Abd al-Wahhab studied higher Hadith studies under Kashmiri and became the seminary's first Bengali to graduate from that course.

Sufism 
After completing his education at Deoband, Shah Abd al-Wahhab joined the Khanqah-i-Imdadiyah in Thana Bhawan to become a disciple of the Ashraf Ali Thanwi, which was also the wish of his teacher in Hathazari, Habibullah Qurayshi. For this reason, Qurayshi wrote a letter to Thanwi. Within 18 days of arriving in Thana Bhawan, Thanwi granted khilafat (spiritual succession) to Shah Abd al-Wahhab, which was the fastest instance of Thanwi granting khilafat to anyone. If anyone objected, Thanwi would say that Abd al-Wahhab had come with everything and all that remained was the granting of khilafat. Shah Abd al-Wahhab then left Thana Bhawan after being granted the title of Junayd-e-Waqt and was appointed as the leader of Muslims in Bengal, Assam, and Burma. Abd al-Wahhab's name is sixteenth on the list at Khanqah-i-Imdadiyah. Shah Abd al-Wahhab had 22 disciples, among whom Ishaq al-Ghazi is notable.

Career 
Abd al-Wahhab returned to Bengal in 1920. The news of his 18-day grant of successorship from Thanwi reached Bengal, and upon his arrival at the Port of Chittagong, a large public reception was organized by locals. He began his career as a senior teacher of Sahih Muslim at his former institution, Darul Uloom Hathazari. Later, a vice-principal position was required due to the expansion of the institution's activities, and with the advice of Zamiruddin Ahmad, Abd al-Wahhab was appointed in 1930. In 1939, he was appointed as the rector of Darul Uloom Hathazari by the 39-member Shura, and he began his duties in 1941. His term is often referred to as the "era of the Shah" or "Hathazari's golden era" because of the significant developments that took place in the institution under his leadership. Abd al-Wahhab renamed the institution from "Madrasa Muinul Islam" (Spring of Islam madrasa) to "Jamia Ahlia Darul Uloom Muinul Islam". This naming style gained so much acceptance that it was followed by all leading madrasas in Bangladesh offering Dawra-e-Hadith (Masters).

Hathazari madrasa 
Abd al-Wahhab was the first scholar to offer specialized studies and research beyond Dawra-e-Hadith (Masters) in Bangladesh. Through his efforts, the Darul Uloom Hathazari established a Department of Fatwa in 1945, a Department of Arabic in 1948, a Department of Writing in 1955, and a Department of Technical Training in 1966. As a result of his methodology, Al Jamia Al Islamia Patiya opened its Department of Bengali Language and Literature in 1952 and its Department of Qira'ah in 1975.

In 1934, Abd al-Wahhab started the Islam Prachar, a monthly magazine with Abul Farah as the chief editor. This was the first Deobandi monthly in the Bengali language. In January 1952, he founded the Monthly Muinul Islam magazine, which serves as a mouthpiece for the institution. A few years before that, Abd al-Wahhab had founded the Daily Pasban magazine in Dhaka. In 1961, he established An-Nadi ath-Thaqafi, which was the first Deobandi student organization dedicated to arts, literature, and culture. At that time, there were a few private libraries for religious books, but no special library for academic books. To address this deficiency, Abd al-Wahhab founded the Ashrafia Library in 1954, named after his mentor Ashraf Ali Thanwi. These non-profit libraries provided books at low cost. Books from Lebanon, Egypt, Saudi Arabia, India, and other countries were readily accessible from the library. Abd al-Wahhab later donated all the books to the Darul Uloom Muinul Islam Central Library and established a postal department in place of the library.

During the Hathazari turmoil in 1941, the British government closed the madrasa, locking up the office and classrooms and filing a case against the institution. In this crisis, Abd al-Wahhab sold a significant portion of his property (which is currently worth hundreds of crores of rupees) to handle the case. The British government lost the case, and redevelopment of the madrasa began within a year. Abd al-Wahhab himself cleared the overgrown grass and weeds, cleaned the cattle excrement, and used his own clothes and sheets to clean the classrooms. He recorded the names of re-admitted students in the registry book himself. Many people believe that without his leadership, it would have been challenging to find proper Islamic education and culture in Bangladesh today. Abd al-Wahhab is remembered as the second architect of Darul Uloom Hathazari for his sacrifice and supreme leadership. From 1948 to 1971, he served as a juror at the Chittagong Court.

In the 1970s, Abd al-Wahhab initiated a medical training program. His eldest son-in-law, Dr. Nurul Haq, was appointed to cover modern medical services, while Abdul Haq Barisali was responsible for the hakimi side. Additionally, Al Jamia Al Islamia Patiya began their Community Health Workers training program. On one occasion, Abd al-Wahhab fell ill and was taken to Chittagong General Hospital for treatment by Muhammad Ibrahim. Abd al-Wahhab later became a source of inspiration for Ibrahim, who founded BIRDEM and the Diabetic Association of Bangladesh.

Literary sponsorship 
One of his notable additions to the multifaceted measures to promote the religion was the initiation of regular tafsir gatherings. Shah Abd al-Wahhab first introduced a weekly tafsir gathering at Anderkilla Shahi Jame Mosque. From the start of the 1960s, this style spread across Chittagong and gained widespread popularity. In his instruction, Mufti Ahmadul Haq and Abul Hasan Babunagari would give speeches on Mondays and Wednesdays. Following this, large events were held in different places of the country including Chittagong. After that he initiated monthly, bi-monthly specialized gatherings in a slightly different manner such as National Seerat Conference and National Qira'at Conference. 

Muhammad Faizullah granted him the title of Hakim an-Nafs. During the Hathazari turmoil, his surprising turmoil led to him being given the title of Rijal al-Asr. His leadership in the Hathazari movement led him to being referred to as Amir al-Ulama. During a Jamiat Ulema-e-Islam conference in Laldighi on 31 January 1949, Shabbir Ahmad Usmani conferred upon him the title of Imam al-Mukhlisin and Zafar Ahmad Usmani gave him the title of Hakim al-Islam. His position in the spiritual world was on the highest path. During a scholars' conference, Khalifa-e-Kandhlawi Mawlana Zubayr referred to him as Qutb al-Irshad.

After the first Shaykhul Hadith Saeed Ahmad Sandwipi left Hathazari, a kind of emptiness prevailed in the institution as there was no one qualified to take his place. For this reason, Shah Abd al-Wahhab travelled to India in 1942–43 and managed to bring Ibrahim Baliyavi, the senior muhaddith of Darul Uloom Deoband, to come to Hathazari with a monthly wage of 500 takas. Besides, for 2 years, Baliyavi had borne the entire expenses of the family of about ten students. He served as Shaykhul Hadith for 2.5-3 years before returning to Deoband. Before leaving, Baliyavi said "Where there is a Yaqub (former Shaykhul Hadith of Hathazari), there is no need for an Ibrahim".

Even though he could not find time at all for writing original books due to various activities, he has supported this aspect throughout his life. He often advised and recommended Shamsul Haque Faridpuri, eventually establishing the Emdadia Library in Dhaka and Islamia Library in Chittagong. His fundamental contribution is in the import, development and spread of lithography and technology among Deobandis. Abd al-Wahhab was the main inspiration behind Tanzeem al-Ashtat, an explanation of Mishkat al-Masabih by Abul Hasan Babunagari. Towards the end of the 1940s, the original manuscript was prepared from the given text to Shah Abd al-Wahhab. With his own finances, Abd al-Wahhab published and promoted Faiz al-Kalam by Muhammad Faizullah. Shah Abd al-Wahhab was also the main person behind Fatawa-e-Darul Uloom Hathazari. With his advice, Mufti Ahmadul Haq of Hathazari began the work of saving and compiling the issued fatwas from Hathazari.

Shah Abd al-Wahhab wrote a lot of poetry. His poetic practice was mainly focused on ethics and based upon Ta‘alluq Ma‘ Allah (Relationship between the Creator and creation). Besides encouraging the practice of poetry, he was also a patron of poetry. He would write the first sentence of a poem on a piece of paper, and ask someone from an-Nadi ath-Thaqafi to write the second sentence. If they could do justice to it, he would award them, if not, he would write it himself. Azizul Haq and Siddiq Ahmad would compete in these poetry competitions and intensify them when they would visit Hathazari.

Political and social works 
The declaration of making Bengali one of the state languages of Pakistan in the manifesto of the Nizam-e-Islam Party was written under his direction. During his time as the vice-president of Jamiat Ulema-e-Islam, he was legendary in his patronage of Islamic politics in East Pakistan. He was the first to protest against West Pakistani injustice in the grounds of Darul Uloom Hathazari. He was the organizer of the collective effort by the ulama against the "Muslim Family Laws" bill by President Ayub Khan. 

He was a patron of Muhammadullah Hafezzi and his Tawba politics. Islamic University, Bangladesh, Baitul Mukarram National Mosque, initiation of Tablighi movement in Bangladesh and Myanmar, preaching, sponsoring the Tablighi Jamaat and the Bishwa Ijtema in Tongi, leadership during establishment of Befaqul Madarisil Arabia Bangladesh, widow remarriage, fair female education in a safe environment, taking care of orphans, his contribution in all fields is extensive.

Shah Abd al-Wahhab was invited by Ibn Saud to Saudi Arabia in 1939. He represented the Qawmi scholars at the Lahore Resolution in 1940. Following the Partition of Bengal in 1947, Shah Abd al-Wahhab toured the Muslim world visiting places such as Myanmar, Egypt and countries in Africa. He played an important role in the development of Islam in South Africa. Shah Abd al-Wahhab was invited to Al-Azhar University, and made suitable arrangements for Bengali-speaking students to study and research at Al-Azhar. These arrangements are still in effect today. He was also invited to the historic Makkah conference.

During the Bangladesh Liberation War of 1971, he arranged a special langarkhana for those in danger regardless of religion. It is said that he had the longest and biggest dastarkhan in Bengal.

Madrasa establishing 
Among his established madrasas are: 

Jamia Arabia Darul Hidayah Pesha, Naogaon (1946)
Jamia Islamia Arabia Mazahirul Uloom, Chittagong (1947)
Jamia Islamia Mahmudia, Barisal (1947)
Jamia Arabia Muhiul Islam Noapara, Jessore (1948)
Darul Hadith Madrasa, Nawabganj (1950)
Madarsha Madrasa, Hathazari, Chittagong (1955)
Hakimia Madrasa (Chittagong Tablighi Markaz Madrasa), Love Lane, Chittagong (1955)
Jamia Izazia Darul Uloom Rail Station, Jessore (1956)
Jamia Islamia Qasimul Uloom, Bogra (1960)
Jamia Islamia Nawabganj (1967)
Jamia Islamia Arabia Darul Uloom Khulna (1967)
Jamia Arabia Shamsul Uloom Faridpur (1969)
Madrasa Ihyaul Uloom Halishahar, Chittagong (1970)
Darul Uloom Deyang Pahar, Daulatpur, Chittagong (1974)
Madrasa Kashiful Uloom Khandaqia, Chittagong (1977)
Madrasa Mahmudia Madinatul Uloom Bathua, Chittagong (1977)
Madrasa Muhiul Islam, Garduara, Hathazari, Chittagong (1977)
Muhammadia Madrasa, Hajirpul, Chandgaon, Chittagong (1980)

In respect to Shah Abd al-Wahhab's advice, Athar Ali established the Imdadul Uloom Madrasa in Kishoreganj in 1945. In 1956, under Shah Abd al-Wahhab's initiative, Shamsul Haque Faridpuri founded the Jamia Arabia Imdadul Uloom Faridabad madrasa in Dhaka. Shah Abd al-Wahhab made the decision for Muhammadullah Hafezzi to be its director. Also, under his encouragement and guidance, many more madrasahs, maktabs, mosques and khanqahs were established in remote areas of the country's divisional towns.

Death and legacy
Shah Abd al-Wahhab died on 2 June 1982. He had five sons and eight daughters. His janaza was led by Muhammadullah Hafezzi, and was subsequently buried at the Maqbara-e-Habibi near Masjid Noor in Hathazari.

References 

Deobandis
1894 births
1982 deaths
Hanafis
20th-century Bengalis
Bengali Muslim scholars of Islam
People from Hathazari Upazila
Bengali-language writers
Bengali writers
Bangladeshi Sunni Muslim scholars of Islam
Darul Uloom Deoband alumni
Mazahir Uloom alumni
Darul Uloom Hathazari Alumni
Director general of Darul Uloom Hathazari
Disciples of Ashraf Ali Thanwi
Bangladeshi people of Arab descent